Harriman State Park is a public recreation area located on the  Harriman Wildlife Refuge in Fremont County,  south of Island Park in eastern Idaho, United States. The state park is within the Henry's Fork Caldera in the Greater Yellowstone Ecosystem. It is home to an abundance of elk, moose, sandhill cranes, trumpeter swans, and the occasional black or grizzly bear. Two-thirds of the trumpeter swans that winter in the contiguous United States spend the season in Harriman State Park.

History
The park's acreage was owned by Union Pacific Railroad investors from 1902 to 1977, serving as a cattle ranch and private retreat for the Harriman and Guggenheim families. It was deeded to Idaho for free in 1977 by Roland and W. Averell Harriman, whose insistence that the state have a professional park managing service helped prompt the creation of the Idaho Department of Parks and Recreation in 1965. The park opened to the public in 1982.

Support group
Friends of Harriman State Park, Inc., a 501(c)(3) organization dedicated to community projects that directly benefit Harriman State Park of Idaho, was formed in 2010 after an announcement by the State of Idaho of the need to cut park funding completely and eventually dissolve the Idaho Department of Parks and Recreation into another state agency, a contingency that was not put in place.

Activities and amenities
Henry's Fork, a fly-fishing stream of note, winds through park meadows for eight miles. The park offers trails for hiking, biking, and horseback riding. In winter, roads and trails are groomed for cross-country skiing.

See also
 List of Idaho state parks
 National Parks in Idaho

References

External links 
Harriman State Park Idaho Parks and Recreation
Harriman State Park and Harriman Wildlife Refuge Boundaries Map Idaho Parks and Recreation
Friends of Harriman State Park

Protected areas of Fremont County, Idaho
State parks of Idaho
Protected areas established in 1977
Yellowstone hotspot